Dolichopus albicoxa is a species of longlegged flies in the family Dolichopodidae.

References

Further reading

 Diptera.info
 

albicoxa
Taxa named by John Merton Aldrich
Insects described in 1893